"Little More (Royalty)" is a song by American singer and songwriter Chris Brown from his seventh studio album Royalty. It was produced by The Audibles and Poo Bear. The song peaking at number 91 on the US Billboard Hot 100, and number 32 on the US Hot R&B/Hip-Hop Songs chart.

Music video

Background and synopsis
On December 18, 2015, Brown uploaded the music video for "Little More (Royalty)" on his YouTube and Vevo account. In the video, Chris wakes up after a night of partying to find a little girl looking around his bedroom.  He winds up acting very confused, but that confusion turns to love. The video shows them playing together, eating, and doing all sorts of fun things.

Reception
Many critics have praised the video saying that Brown shows a more playful side in the video, playing with his little girl, feeding her breakfast, dancing, blowing bubbles and just generally goofing off together.

Charts

Weekly charts

Certifications and sales

References

2015 songs
Chris Brown songs
Songs written by Chris Brown
Songs written by Poo Bear
Song recordings produced by the Audibles
Songs written by James Giannos
Songs written by Dominic Jordan